Mezőkövesd is a district in south-western part of Borsod-Abaúj-Zemplén County. Mezőkövesd is also the name of the town where the district seat is found. The district is located in the Northern Hungary Statistical Region.

Geography 
Mezőkövesd District borders with Miskolc District to the northeast, Mezőcsát District to the east, Tiszafüred District (Jász-Nagykun-Szolnok County) to the south, Füzesabony District and Eger District (Heves County) to the west. The number of the inhabited places in Mezőkövesd District is 23.

Municipalities 
The district has 2 towns, 1 large village and 20 villages.
(ordered by population, as of 1 January 2012)

The bolded municipalities are cities, italics municipality is large village.

Demographics

In 2011, it had a population of 42,432 and the population density was 59/km².

Ethnicity
Besides the Hungarian majority, the main minorities are the Roma (approx. 2,500) and German (200).

Total population (2011 census): 42,432
Ethnic groups (2011 census): Identified themselves: 40,091 persons:
Hungarians: 37,326 (93.10%)
Gypsies: 2,202 (5.49%)
Others and indefinable: 563 (1.40%)
Approx. 2,500 persons in Mezőkövesd District did not declare their ethnic group at the 2011 census.

Religion
Religious adherence in the county according to 2011 census:

Catholic – 22,530 (Roman Catholic – 22,312; Greek Catholic – 212);
Reformed – 6,163;
Evangelical – 55;
other religions – 522; 
Non-religious – 3,274; 
Atheism – 228;
Undeclared – 9,662.

Gallery

See also
List of cities and towns of Hungary
Mezőkövesd Subregion (until 2013)

References

External links
 Postal codes of the Mezőkövesd District

Districts in Borsod-Abaúj-Zemplén County